San Giovanni in Fiore is a town and comune in the province of Cosenza in the Calabria region of southern Italy.

The town originates from the Florense Abbey, built here by the Calabrian monk Joachim of Fiore in 1188.

Marjorie Reeves of Oxford University was made an honorary citizen of San Giovanni for reviving interest in Joachim of Fiore.

References 

Cities and towns in Calabria